Vedran Celišćak (born 16 July 1982) is a Croatian footballer who currently plays for German amateur side SV Blau/Weiß Heilbronn.

References

External links
 iFotBol profile

1982 births
Living people
People from Koprivnica
Association football midfielders
Croatian footballers
NK Slaven Belupo players
HNK Hajduk Split players
NK Osijek players
HNK Rijeka players
FC Moscow players
FC Oryol players
HŠK Posušje players
NK Međimurje players
Dalian Shide F.C. players
HNK Šibenik players
NK Croatia Sesvete players
NK Zagreb players
Croatian Football League players
Russian Premier League players
Russian First League players
Premier League of Bosnia and Herzegovina players
Chinese Super League players
Croatian expatriate footballers
Expatriate footballers in Russia
Croatian expatriate sportspeople in Russia
Expatriate footballers in Bosnia and Herzegovina
Croatian expatriate sportspeople in Bosnia and Herzegovina
Expatriate footballers in China
Croatian expatriate sportspeople in China